Sunday Ibrahim (born 20 December 1980) is a Nigerian footballer who played in the Ekstraklasa in Poland for Wisła Kraków, KSZO Ostrowiec Świętokrzyski and Zagłębie Lubin. He also played in his native Nigeria, in China and in Norway.

Career
Ibrahim was born in Ibadan, and began his football career with his hometown club, Greater Tomorrow, as a youngster. He also played for Liberty Boys, Nigerdock and Eagle Cement before moving to Poland to sign for Wisła Kraków in the 1997–98 season. He made his debut in the Ekstraklasa on 28 March 1998 away to KSZO Ostrowiec Świętokrzyski. Taking the field as a 72nd-minute substitute, he scored the only goal of the game seven minutes later. He finished the season with ten Ekstraklasa appearances, all but one as a substitute, and three goals. The following season he made 13 appearances as Wisła Kraków won the 1998–99 Ekstraklasa title, and played in the finals of the 2001 and 2002 Ekstraklasa Cup and the 2002 Polish Cup. He played several times for the club in the UEFA Cup and Champions League.

In 2003, he spent a few months on loan at Ekstraklasa club KSZO Ostrowiec Świętokrzyski, but on his return to Wisła was only picked for the reserves, so chose to leave. He joined Chinese club Chengdu Wuniu and then Strømsgodset in the Norwegian Adeccoligaen, before returning to the Ekstraklasa with Zagłębie Lubin. He again played in the Polish Cup Final, in 2006, but had problems with weight and fitness. After surgery on a knee injury and subsequent rehabilitation, he went on to play in the lower divisions of the Polish league with Hutnik Kraków, GKP Gorzów Wielkopolski, Stal Rzeszów and Warta Sieradz.

References

External links
 

1980 births
Living people
Nigerian footballers
Association football midfielders
Dolphin F.C. (Nigeria) players
Wisła Kraków players
KSZO Ostrowiec Świętokrzyski players
Chengdu Tiancheng F.C. players
China League One players
Strømsgodset Toppfotball players
Zagłębie Lubin players
Hutnik Nowa Huta players
Stilon Gorzów Wielkopolski players
Ekstraklasa players
Nigerian expatriate footballers
Expatriate footballers in Poland
Expatriate footballers in China
Expatriate footballers in Norway
Stal Rzeszów players
Nigerian expatriate sportspeople in Poland
Nigerian expatriate sportspeople in China
Nigerian expatriate sportspeople in Norway
Sportspeople from Ibadan